Delmo may refer to:

Given name
 Delmo Alberghini (1922–2013), American hurdler
 Delmo Delmastro (born 1936), Argentine cyclist
 Delmo da Silva (1954–2010), Brazilian sprinter
 Delmo (footballer) (born 1973), Delmo Arcângelo Coelho Monteiro, Brazilian footballer

Places
 Delmo Community Center, historic community centre in Homestown, Missouri

See also
 Elmo (disambiguation)